A gofer is an errand runner.

Gofer may also refer to:
Gofer (programming language), educational version of Haskell 
GOFER, mnemonic device for a decision-making discipline

See also
Gopher (disambiguation)